Nadica Nikolić Tanasijević is a politician in Serbia. She served in the National Assembly of Serbia from 2014 to 2020 as a member of the Serbian Progressive Party.

Private career
Nikolić Tanasijević is an archaeologist. She is from Ritopek, in the Belgrade municipality of Grocka.

Politician
Nikolić Tanasijević received the 114th position on the Progressive Party's Aleksandar Vučić — Future We Believe In electoral list in the 2014 Serbian parliamentary election and was elected when the list won a majority victory with 158 out of 250 mandates. During her time in parliament, she was a deputy member of the committee on agriculture, forestry, and management; a deputy member of the culture and information committee; a deputy member of the committee for labour, social issues, social inclusion, and poverty reduction; and a member of the parliamentary friendship groups with France, Italy, Slovenia, Turkey, the United Kingdom.

She received the 230th position on the successor Aleksandar Vučić – Serbia Is Winning list in the 2016 Serbian parliamentary election. This was too low a position for re-election to be a realistic possibility, and indeed she was not re-elected even as the list won a second consecutive majority with 131 mandates.

References

1970 births
Living people
Politicians from Belgrade
21st-century Serbian women politicians
21st-century Serbian politicians
Members of the National Assembly (Serbia)
Serbian Progressive Party politicians
Women members of the National Assembly (Serbia)